In Greek mythology, Aeopolus was the father of Cleobule (Theobule), one of the possible mother of Myrtilus by Hermes. He was also called Aeolus.

Notes

Reference 

 Gaius Julius Hyginus, Fabulae from The Myths of Hyginus translated and edited by Mary Grant. University of Kansas Publications in Humanistic Studies. Online version at the Topos Text Project.

Characters in Greek mythology